The Minister of Local Government is a ministerial portfolio in the government of New Zealand with responsibility for supporting and overseeing New Zealand's local government system.

The position also has a role supporting the relationship between central government and local government, oversight of the Local Government Commission, and acts as the territorial authority for the 11 islands that are not part of a local authority's district and as the harbour authority for Lake Taupo.

The portfolio was established in 1972, prior to which, local government had been within the purview of the Minister of Internal Affairs. Notwithstanding the separation of those responsibilities, the offices of Minister of Internal Affairs and Minister of Local Government were held by the same person for the first twelve years that a separate local government portfolio existed. The Minister of Local Government is still supported by the Department of Internal Affairs.

The current minister is Kieran McAnulty.

List of Ministers
The following ministers have held the office of Minister of Local Government.

Key

See also
Minister of Internal Affairs (New Zealand)

Notes

References

Local Government